Murray Ernest Chapple (25 July 1930 – 31 July 1985) was a New Zealand cricketer who played 14 Test matches over 13 years. However, he was largely unsuccessful, with only three fifties and a highest score of 76.

Playing career
In a first-class career that began when he was 19 and ended when he was 41, he played for Canterbury (1949–50, 1952–53 to 1960–61) and Central Districts (1950–51 to 1951–52, 1962–63 to 1965–66), toured South Africa with the New Zealand teams in 1953–54 and 1961–62, and captained New Zealand in the First Test against England in 1965–66.

He came to national prominence in 1952–53 when, after four Plunket Shield seasons in which his highest score was 79, he scored 165 and 88 opening the batting for Canterbury against the touring South Africans. He was selected for Second Test against South Africa, and the tour of South Africa the following season. His best bowling figures were 5 for 24 for Canterbury against Auckland in 1955–56.

After a leg injury forced him out of the Second Test in 1965–66, he retired.

Administrative career
While managing the New Zealand team that toured West Indies in 1971–72, he played in the match against Windward Islands when injuries reduced the side to ten fit players, but the match was ruined by rain and he did not bat, bowl or field. His management of the tour was praised by Henry Blofeld in Wisden: "He did a lot to relieve his players of the many different pressures which were upon them and was always a wise counsellor. He must share the credit for the success of the tour ..."

He also managed the New Zealand side that toured India and Pakistan in 1976–77, and had been appointed to manage the team to England in 1986.

References

External links
 

1930 births
1985 deaths
Canterbury cricketers
Central Districts cricketers
New Zealand Test cricket captains
South Island cricketers